Oliver J. Miller (born April 6, 1970) is an American former professional basketball player. He was nicknamed "The Big O" because of his large size ( and well over  throughout his pro career). Miller played college basketball at the University of Arkansas and was drafted by the Phoenix Suns in 1992. After his initial stint in the NBA from 1992 to 1998, where he became the heaviest player in league history, Miller played overseas and for semi-professional American teams. He returned to the NBA for the 2003–04 season, but he transitioned back to minor-league and semi-professional play, and he retired from professional basketball in 2010.

Early life, family and education

Oliver Miller was born and raised in Fort Worth, Texas, where he attended Southwest High School. He was a star athlete.

He attended the University of Arkansas and played for its Razorbacks basketball team. He graduated in 1992.

Career
Miller was selected by the Phoenix Suns with the 22nd overall pick of the 1992 NBA draft. He went on to play for various NBA teams over his eight-year career, including the Suns (1992–94, 1999–2000), Detroit Pistons (1994–95), Toronto Raptors (1995–96 and 1997–98), Dallas Mavericks (1996–97) and Sacramento Kings (1998–99). He was signed by the Indiana Pacers during the 2002 pre-season but was waived before the regular season began.

Miller was known as a talented center with good passing skills, averaging 12.9 points, 7.4 rebounds, 2.9 assists, 1.9 blocks and 1.4 steals per game at his peak (1995–96). However, he was also notorious for his weight problems.

Following his initial stint in the NBA, Miller moved overseas, joining Iraklio BC in Greece for the 1998–99 season. However, in February 1999, he signed with the Kings to play in 4 games.  He spent the next season back with the Suns, playing in 51 games.  After the season, Miller became a bit of a basketball vagabond, joining the Harlem Globetrotters for the first of two stints with the team, then Pruszkow in Poland and back to the Globetrotters. In December 2001, after another brief term with the Globetrotters, Miller was released for showing "no appreciation for what it takes mentally and physically to be a Harlem Globetrotter." In January 2002 he signed with the Roseto Sharks in Italy, but he did not play there. He then joined the Continental Basketball Association with the Gary Steelheads in Gary, Indiana, before moving to the competing American Basketball Association's Southern California Surf and the USBL's Dodge City Legend.  He returned to the Steelheads in October 2002, and was traded to the Dakota Wizards in February 2003. He earned All-CBA Second Team honors with the Wizards at the end of the 2002–03 season.

In the 2003–04 season, Miller made a comeback with the Minnesota Timberwolves. After a stint in Puerto Rico, Miller returned to the Wizards in October 2004 and next played with the Texas Tycoons in the ABA until February 2005. He then played in 2005 for the Arkansas RimRockers in the ABA. Miller was next signed to the Lawton-Fort Sill Cavalry of the Premier Basketball League on March 15, 2010, but he was released in December.

Career after athletics
Miller reportedly relocated to Mesa, Arizona in August 2012 and was a car salesman, working for former basketball player Alvin Heggs. He has also spent time participating in basketball camps.

Honors and awards

Miller was inducted into the University of Arkansas Sports Hall of Honor in September 2016 and was selected as an SEC Basketball Legend in January 2017.

Personal life
Miller has two sons and a daughter.

Legal troubles
In April 2011, Miller was accused of pistol-whipping a man during an altercation at a barbecue cookout in Arnold, Maryland. He was arrested and charged with first- and second-degree assault, reckless endangerment, possessing a handgun, using a handgun in a violent crime, possessing a handgun in a vehicle and disorderly conduct, among other charges. On November 1, 2011, Miller pleaded guilty in Anne Arundel County to first-degree assault and possessing a handgun. He was sentenced on February 3, 2012 to a year in the Anne Arundel County jail (a five-year sentence with four years suspended), followed by five years of probation.

References

External links 
Player profile at NBA.com

Oliver Miller at HoopsHype.com

1970 births
Living people
American expatriate basketball people in Canada
American expatriate basketball people in Greece
American expatriate basketball people in Italy
American expatriate basketball people in Poland
American men's basketball players
American people convicted of assault
American sportspeople convicted of crimes
Arkansas Razorbacks men's basketball players
Basketball players from Texas
Centers (basketball)
Dakota Wizards (CBA) players
Dallas Mavericks players
Detroit Pistons players
Harlem Globetrotters players
Irakleio B.C. players
Minnesota Timberwolves players
MKS Znicz Basket Pruszków players
Phoenix Suns draft picks
Phoenix Suns players
Sacramento Kings players
Sportspeople from Fort Worth, Texas
Sportspeople from Mesa, Arizona
Toronto Raptors expansion draft picks
Toronto Raptors players